True Movies 2 was a British free-to-air television channel that was owned by Moving Movies Ltd., majority owned by CSC Media Group (formerly Chart Show Channels). It was launched on 20 March 2006 and was a sister channel from True Movies which was launched on 29 April 2005. True Movies 2 initially broadcast for two hours in the early morning, from 4am to 6am by timesharing with Pop, a children's cartoon channel. The service was later extended to 24 hours a day.

True Movies 2 was aimed especially at a female audience with its movies dedicated to true life dramas, which are mostly made-for-TV movies.

Reception of the channel did not require any special Sky or Freesat equipment nor subscription, any free to air receiver can pick up the channel.
The channel was temporarily rebranded from 19 May to 2 June 2014 as True Murder. From 30 September 2016, the channel was replaced by True Movies +1.

English-language television stations in the United Kingdom
Movie channels in the United Kingdom
CSC Media Group
Sony Pictures Television
Television channels and stations established in 2006
Television channels and stations disestablished in 2016